Marina Kress (born 23 August 1980) is a Belarusian professional basketball player currently playing for Horizont Minsk.

Honors
Galatasaray
Turkish Presidents Cup
Winners: 2007–2008
EuroCup Women
Winners: 2008–2009

References

External links
Profile at galatasaray.org
Profile at tbl.org.tr
Player Profile at Eurobasket Women 2009

1980 births
Living people
Basketball players at the 2008 Summer Olympics
Belarusian expatriate basketball people in France
Belarusian expatriate basketball people in Greece
Belarusian expatriate basketball people in Poland
Belarusian expatriate basketball people in Russia
Belarusian expatriate basketball people in Spain
Belarusian expatriate basketball people in Turkey
Belarusian women's basketball players
Botaş SK players
Centers (basketball)
Galatasaray S.K. (women's basketball) players
Olympic basketball players of Belarus
Basketball players from Minsk